The 2003 Copa del Rey Juvenil was the 53rd staging of the tournament. The competition began on May 18, 2003 and ended on June 29, 2003 with the final.

First round

|}

Quarterfinals

|}

Semifinals

|}

Final

Copa del Rey Juvenil de Fútbol
Juvenil